Glen Rock is a borough in York County, Pennsylvania, United States. The population was 2,120 at the 2020 census.

History
The Glen Rock Historic District was listed on the National Register of Historic Places in 1997.

Glen Rock was founded on August 29, 1859. It started in 1837 with William Heathcote — a native of Cheshire, England, who moved to Pennsylvania in 1826.

Heathcote noted the area's water power potential and bought a farm with an abandoned sawmill from a local farmer. He then built a brick woolen mill on the sawmill's foundation. Farmers and mill workers began to populate the surrounding area, and the arrival of the first passenger train soon afterward provided a way for them to ship their goods to large nearby cities.

Life in Glen Rock boomed throughout the 1840s with the introduction of a post office, church, iron foundry and machine shop. But the area didn't officially become a borough until August 29, 1859, the year after the 200 residents petitioned local courts for incorporation.

Geography
Glen Rock is located at  (39.793471, -76.731520).

Demographics

As of the census of 2000, there were 1,809 people (2,025 in the 2010 census), 708 households (785 in the 2010 census), and 506 families (543 in the 2010 census) living in the borough.  The racial makeup of the borough was 98.07% White(96.1% in the 2010 census), 1.00% African American(2.9% in the 2010 census), 0.17% Native American, 0.33% Asian, 0.06% Pacific Islander, and 0.39% from two or more races. Hispanic or Latino of any race were 0.44% of the population (2.3% in the 2010 census).

There were 708 households (785 in the 2010 census) out of which 38.7% had children under the age of 18 living with them (36.3% in the 2010 census), 55.4% were married couples living together, 11.0% had a female householder with no husband present, and 28.5% were non-families. 23.7% of all households were made up of individuals, and 9.0% had someone living alone who was 65 years of age or older. The average household size was 2.56 and the average family size was 3.04.

In the borough the population was spread out, with 29.0% under the age of 18, 6.7% from 18 to 24, 33.9% from 25 to 44, 19.2% from 45 to 64, and 11.2% who were 65 years of age or older. The median age was 35 years. For every 100 females there were 99.4 males. For every 100 females age 18 and over, there were 96.5 males.

The median income for a household in the borough was $41,188, and the median income for a family was $50,865. Males had a median income of $33,571 versus $27,067 for females. The per capita income for the borough was $19,076. About 6.3% of families and 8.7% of the population were below the poverty line, including 15.0% of those under age 18 and 4.5% of those age 65 or over.

Carolers
Every Christmas, the Glen Rock Carolers sing carols throughout the borough from midnight until morning. This tradition began in 1848 and has continued uninterrupted since then. The carolers, a group of 50+ men, sing in three-part harmony and are accompanied by instruments, currently trumpets and trombones. Most of the carols sung are old English or old American and are not commonly heard anymore; only four carols have been added since 1900. The carolers themselves are recognized by their distinctive uniform consisting of gray high hats, greatcoats, gloves, and multi-color scarves. A concert given at 10:45 pm on Christmas Eve regularly attracts a crowd of around 1,000.

Recreation
The Heritage Rail Trail County Park is a National Recreation Trail rail-with-trail in Pennsylvania built in 1999 by the York County Rail Trail Authority (YCRTA). It connects with the Torrey C. Brown Rail Trail in Maryland. The trail runs along the active Northern Central Railway line and forms the southernmost part of Route J in the BicyclePA route system.

The rail trail runs north through the borough intersecting Valley, Main and Water Streets. The rail line is active with passenger freight from Steam Into History located in nearby New Freedom, Pennsylvania.

The Glen Rock Park is located at 5400 Fair School Road adjacent to the Borough. The park features a dog park, two ball fields, playground equipment, basketball and volleyball court, restroom facilities and pavilions available for rent. The park is managed by the Glen Rock recreation board.

The Annual Glen Rock Arts & Brew Fest is held on the Saturday of Memorial Day weekend. The event is primarily held in the area of Water Street and the Rail Trail with the craft beer event in Ruins Hall. Food and art vendors, a 5k race and family-friendly events are featured.

Notable residents

 Cliff Heathcote, (1898–1939) was a center fielder in Major League Baseball who played for the Chicago Cubs.

References

External links
 Glen Rock during the American Civil War

Populated places established in 1838
Boroughs in York County, Pennsylvania
1859 establishments in Pennsylvania